Central Washington is a region of the U.S. state of Washington between the western and eastern parts of the state extending from the border with the Canadian province of British Columbia in the north to the border with the U.S. state of Oregon in the south. Generally, the western edge is the Cascade Range and the eastern edge is in the vicinity of the 119th meridian west.

Central Washington is also further divided into North Central and South Central. Washington State Department of Transportation uses these groupings as part of their district office divisions.
North Central Washington, or NCW, is defined as including Chelan, Douglas, and Okanogan counties. The Washington State Department of Transportation and the North Central Region Library includes Grant County In addition, the library system and the Heritage Museum includes Ferry County. Wenatchee is the largest city in this region.
South Central Washington includes Benton, Kittitas, Klickitat, and Yakima Counties, in addition to all counties south of the Snake River, in the Department of Transportation use of the term. Yakima is the largest city in this region. If Benton and Franklin counties are included, then the Tri-Cities are both the largest urban area and the center of the largest metro area in this region.

Counties
Central Washington is made up of the following counties:
Benton
Chelan
Douglas
Grant
Kittitas
Klickitat
Okanogan
Yakima

Cities of note
Chelan
East Wenatchee
Ellensburg
Ephrata
Moses Lake
Omak
Tri-Cities
Wenatchee
Yakima
Quincy

Colleges and universities
Central Washington University in Ellensburg
Washington State University Tri-Cities in Richland
Heritage University in Toppenish
Columbia Basin College in Pasco
Wenatchee Valley College in Wenatchee
Big Bend Community College in Moses Lake
Yakima Valley College in Yakima

Notable mountain ranges
Cascade Range
Chiwaukum Mountains
Stuart Range
Wenatchee Mountains

References

External links
North Central Washington photos and information

Regions of Washington (state)